Pamekasan is a town and administrative center of Pamekasan Regency, East Java, Indonesia. The town is located on the island of Madura.

Administrative villages
Pamekasan consists of 18 villages (Kelurahan or Desa) namely:
 Barurambat Kota
 Bettet
 Bugih
 East Teja
 Gladak Anyar
 Jalmak
 Jungcangcang
 Kangenan
 Kolpajung
 Kowel
 Laden
 Nylabu Daya
 Nylabu Laok
 Panempan
 Parteker
 Patemon
 Toronan
 West Teja

Climate
Pamekasan has a tropical savanna climate (Aw) with moderate to little rainfall from May to November and heavy rainfall from December to April.

References 

Madura Island
Districts of East Java
Populated places in East Java
Regency seats of East Java